Jaarli Pirkkiö (born 12 February 1967) is a Finnish weightlifter. He competed in the men's middleweight event at the 1988 Summer Olympics.

References

External links
 

1967 births
Living people
Finnish male weightlifters
Olympic weightlifters of Finland
Weightlifters at the 1988 Summer Olympics
People from Rovaniemi
Sportspeople from Lapland (Finland)